Floralba Krasniqi (born 26 August 1994) is an Albanian football midfielder who currently plays for Union Kleinmünchen in the ÖFB-Frauenliga.

See also
List of Albania women's international footballers

References

1994 births
Living people
Albanian emigrants to Austria
Kosovan emigrants to Austria
Austrian people of Albanian descent
Austrian people of Kosovan descent
Albania women's international footballers
Women's association football midfielders
Place of birth missing (living people)
Albanian women's footballers
ÖFB-Frauenliga players
Union Kleinmünchen players